FDA preemption is the legal theory in the United States that exempts product manufacturers from tort claims regarding products approved by the Food and Drug Administration (FDA). It has been a highly-contentious issue. In general, consumer groups are against it, but the FDA and pharmaceutical manufacturers are in favor of it and argues that the FDA should set both the floor and the ceiling for drug regulation.

Michigan is the only state that voluntarily applies FDA preemption to its own state tort law through a regulatory compliance defense, but the law has been controversial and efforts to repeal it were underway in 2009.

Relevant cases
 Riegel v. Medtronic, Inc. (2008): The US Supreme Court ruled that manufacturers of FDA-approved devices are protected from liability under state laws.
 Wyeth v. Levine (2009): The U.S. Supreme Court ruled that Vermont tort law was not preempted.

See also
 National Childhood Vaccine Injury Act (NCVIA)

References

External links
 Pharmaceutical Research and Manufacturers of America's official statement in support of FDA preemption.
 A statement against FDA preemption

Food and Drug Administration
Tort law